CFNR-FM is a Canadian radio station based in Terrace, British Columbia, owned and operated by Northern Native Broadcasting (Terrace). The station operates at 92.1 FM from the station headquarters in Terrace. The programming reflects and is broadcast to over 70 First Nations communities in northern and central British Columbia and has an audience of over 150,000 listeners. Programming of CFNR-FM is distributed to numerous repeater stations in the region.

The station describes its music programming as classic rock format. Programming includes cultural events such as the Hobiyee celebrations in Vancouver and Nisga'a territory, National Indigenous Peoples Day, and cultural sports broadcasts such as the annual All-Native Tournament and the Junior all Native Basketball Tournaments.

History
CFNR received approval on July 20, 1992, Northern Native Broadcasting was granted a licence for an English-language and Native-language station at Terrace. The same year, CFNR received approval to operate a number of transmitters in northern British Columbia. In 1993, CFNR received approval to add more transmitters. In 1994, CFNR received approval to add a transmitter at Terrace.

On June 14, 2017, the CRTC granted CFNR's owner, Northern Native Broadcasting (Terrace), a license to operate a station in Vancouver at 106.3 MHz FM to serve the urban Indigenous population in that city. The frequency was previously licensed to Aboriginal Voices Radio Network which had its license revoked in 2015 for non-compliance issues. The station's call letters will be CJNY-FM.

Locations 
Communities in which CFNR-FM is broadcast, with their FM frequencies (in MHz) and call sign (where known):

On August 7, 2009, CFNR-FM applied to the CRTC to add a transmitter at Hazelton/Seely Mountain at 96.1 MHz. This application was approved on December 14, 2009.

On October 25, 2013, CFNR-FM received approval to change the authorized contours of VF2073 Quesnel by increasing the transmitter's average effective radiated power from 1.6 to 6.5 watts (non-directional antenna) and the effective height of antenna above average terrain from 81 to 236.2 metres, and by relocating the transmitter site. The change in site was due to frequent vandalism acts committed on the site, which resulted in violations that occurred beyond the station's control, such as the transmitter broadcasting an empty carrier.

On May 21, 2015, CFNR-FM received approval to operate a low-power FM rebroadcasting transmitter at Fort Nelson at 96.1 MHz with an effective radiated power (ERP) of 8 watts (non-directional antenna with an effective height of antenna above average terrain (EHAAT) of 36.7 metres).

On December 8, 2015, CFNR-FM received approval to operate a low-power FM rebroadcasting transmitter at Hartley Bay at 96.1 MHz with an effective radiated power (ERP) of 8 watts (non-directional antenna with an effective height of antenna above average terrain (EHAAT) of -66.8 metres).

Future transmitters
Metlakatla - 98.1 MHz
Toosey Indian Reserve - 96.1 MHz

References

External links 
CFNR-FM
 
 

Fnr
Fnr
Fnr
Radio stations established in 1992
1992 establishments in British Columbia